The 2023 season will be the Minnesota Vikings' 63rd in the National Football League, their eighth playing their home games at U.S. Bank Stadium and their second under the head coach/general manager tandem of  Kevin O'Connell and Kwesi Adofo-Mensah. They will attempt to improve upon their 13-4 record from last year and win the NFC North title in back-to-back seasons for the first time since 2008 and 2009. This will be their first season since 2012 without star wide receiver Adam Thielen on the roster, as he was released on March 10.

Draft

Draft trades

Staff

Current roster

Preseason
The Vikings' preseason opponents and schedule will be announced in the spring.

Regular season

2023 opponents
Listed below are the Vikings' opponents for 2023. Exact dates and times will be announced in the spring.

References

External links
 

Minnesota
Minnesota Vikings seasons
Minnesota Vikings